Frederick Hicks may refer to:

 Frederick Charles Hicks (1863–1953), American university president
 Frederick C. Hicks (1872–1925), United States Representative from New York
 Nugent Hicks (Frederick Cyril Nugent Hicks, 1872–1942), Anglican bishop and author
 Fred Hicks (baseball) (1888–1950), American baseball player
 Fred Hicks, author of Spirit of the Century and FATE (role-playing game system)